Nya Folkviljan ('New Popular Will') was a socialist weekly newspaper published in southern Sweden 1906-1920. It was founded in Helsingborg, but shifted to Malmö in 1907. The paper became associated with Ungsocialisterna.

In the period 1906-1912 the weekly editions of the paper were between 12-16000. In 1920, the weekly edition was 1500.

1917-1920 the full title of the paper was "Nya Folkviljan - organ for anti-Christian and revolutionary socialist propaganda.

References

1906 establishments in Sweden
1920 disestablishments in Sweden
Defunct newspapers published in Sweden
Mass media in Helsingborg
Mass media in Malmö
Weekly newspapers published in Sweden
Newspapers established in 1906
Publications disestablished in 1920
Swedish-language newspapers